Paara Dige  is a 2021 Sri Lankan comedy-drama television series broadcast on Swarnavahini. It is directed by Jayaprakash Sivagurunathan, produced by Chamara Samarawickrama and written by Saddha Mangala Sooriyabandara. It airs every weekday from 8:30 pm to 9:00 pm. The series started on 19 May 2021. The series stars Uddika Premarathna, Dusheni Silva, Kusal Maduranga,  Gayan Gunawardana, Roshan Pilapitiya and Sachin Chathuranga and Induwara Sooriyabandara.

Plot

Cast and characters

Main cast 
 Uddika Premarathna  as Rehan Aluwihare 
 Dusheni Silva as Banti aka Sarani
 Gayan Gunawardana as Bhanuka 
 Kusal Maduranga as "Banda" Bandara/Nishantha Bandara/Nilantha Bandara 
 Roshan Pilapitiya as Nanayakkara 
 Sachin Chathuranga as Abhiya 
 Induwara Sooriyabandara as Jude

Supporting cast 
 Viraj Perera as Rexi
 Gayathri Dias as Pushpa
 Kishu Gomes as Adikaree
 Malkanthi Jayasinghe as Rita, Rehan's mother
 Nithya Devindi as Ruvini, Rehan's sister
 Ananda Athukorala as Wilson, Banti's father
 Sena Gunawardena as Ariyasena, Rehan's servant
 Kanchanamala Mahawithana as Nayana, Banti's mother
 Deshani Nehara as Aanya
 Piyumi Srinayaka as Rukshana, Rehan's ex-wife
 Chandima Karunadasa as Darling
 Koralage Saman as Sisira Kumara Ranasinghe aka Sikura
 Nilu Tanasha as Wathsala, Rukshana's friend

Minor cast 
 Volga Kalpani as Tutu 
 Ishan Wanniarachchi as Jerrad 
 Swapna Sithara as Manavee
 Sangeeth Satharasinha as Damien
 Thathsarani Piyumika as Nisharaa
 Gayathri Pelpola as Aravindi
 Jeevantha Dassanayake as Martiya
 Ishara Athukorale as Sachini, Rukshana's friend
 Gayathri Dissanayake, Martiya's friend
 Christopher Zappia as himself
 Nishantha Amarasinghe as Nanayakkara's henchman
 Thushan Kothalawala as Nanayakkara's henchman
 Shashith Induwara
 Neshmika Nethsara
 Sanjeewa Maduranga
 Vihari Jayasundera
 Imashi Fonseka
 Mandakini Adithya
 Madhavi Priyadarshani
 Ishara Dilini
 Poornima Sewwandi
 U.R. Weerasinghe
 Pubudu Kanishka

Awards

Awards

See also
Nadagamkarayo

Notes

References 

Sri Lankan television shows
2021 Sri Lankan television series debuts
Swarnavahini original programming